Dolichesia is a genus of moths in the subfamily Arctiinae. The genus was erected by Schaus in 1911.

Species
 Dolichesia falsimonia Schaus, 1911
 Dolichesia lignaria Rothschild, 1913

References

Lithosiini